De Negri is an Italian surname. Notable people with the surname include:
Giovanni Battista De Negri, (1851-1924) Italian tenor
Mario De Negri (1901–1978), Italian sprinter
Pierpaolo De Negri (born 1986), Italian cyclist
, Dutch noble family emigrated from Italy
Manuel Y. de Negri, Mexican diplomat.

Italian-language surnames